Thomas Petters Carnes (1762 in Bladensburg, Maryland – May 5, 1822 in Milledgeville, Georgia) was an American lawyer and politician from Franklin County, Georgia. He served as a colonel in the Maryland Line during the American Revolution and received bounty land in Franklin County for his service.

He served in the Georgia House of Representatives at Milledgeville as a state court judge, and represented Georgia in the United States House of Representatives from 1793 until 1795. Carnesville, Georgia, is his namesake. Although he considered his home to be Athens in Clarke County (created from Franklin County), he died in Milledgeville and is buried there at Memory Hill Cemetery.

Notes

References

Georgia.gov history of Carnesville, Georgia
Georgia Journal (May 7, 1822) obituary.
Will of Thomas Petters Carnes written 1816, probated Clarke County, GA.

1762 births
1822 deaths
People from Bladensburg, Maryland
Members of the Georgia House of Representatives
Members of the United States House of Representatives from Georgia (U.S. state)
Georgia (U.S. state) state court judges
Georgia (U.S. state) lawyers
Burials at Memory Hill Cemetery
People from Milledgeville, Georgia
19th-century American lawyers